Forensic materials engineering, a branch of forensic engineering, focuses on the material evidence from crime or accident scenes, seeking  defects in those materials which might explain why an accident occurred, or the source of a specific material to identify a criminal. Many analytical methods used for material identification may be used in investigations, the exact set being determined by the nature of the material in question, be it metal, glass, ceramic, polymer or composite. An important aspect is the analysis of trace evidence such as skid marks on exposed surfaces, where contact between dissimilar materials leaves material traces of one left on the other. Provided the traces can be analysed successfully, then an accident or crime can often be reconstructed. Another aim will be to determine the cause of a broken component using the technique of fractography.

Metals and alloys

Metal surfaces can be analyzed in a number of ways, including by spectroscopy and EDX used during scanning electron microscopy. The nature and composition of the metal can normally be established by sectioning and polishing the bulk, and examining the flat section using optical microscopy after etching solutions have been used to provide contrast in the section between alloy constituents. Such solutions (often an acid) attack the surface preferentially, so isolating features or inclusions of one composition, enabling them to be seen much more clearly than in the polished but untreated surface. Metallography is a routine technique for examining the microstructure of metals, but can also be applied to ceramics, glasses and polymers. SEM can often be critical in  determining failures modes by examining fracture surfaces. The origin of a crack can be found and the way it grew assessed, to distinguish, for example, overload failure from fatigue. Often however, fatigue fractures are easy to distinguish from overload failures by the lack of ductility, and the existence of a fast crack growth region and the slow crack growth area on the fracture surface. Crankshaft fatigue for example is a common failure mode for engine parts. The example shows just two such zones, the slow crack at the base, the fast at the top.

Ceramics and glasses

Hard products like ceramic pottery and glass windscreens can be studied using the same SEM methods used for metals, especially ESEM conducted at low vacuum. Fracture surfaces are especially valuable sources of information because surface features like hachures can enable the origin or origins of the cracks to be found. Analysis of the surface features is carried out using fractography.

The position of the origin can then be matched with likely loads on the product to show how an accident occurred, for example. Inspection of bullet holes can often show the direction of travel and energy of the impact, and the way common glass products like bottles can be analysed to show whether deliberately or accidentally broken in a crime or accident. Defects such as foreign particles will often occur near or at the origin of the critical crack, and can be readily identified by ESEM.

Polymers and composites

Thermoplastics, thermosets, and composites can be analyzed using FTIR and UV spectroscopy as well as NMR and ESEM. Failed samples can either be dissolved in a suitable solvent and examined directly (UV, IR and NMR spectroscopy) or as a thin film cast from solvent or cut using microtomy from the solid product. The slicing method is preferable since there are no complications from solvent absorption, and the integrity of the sample is partly preserved. Fractured products can be examined using fractography, an especially useful method for all fractured components using macrophotography and optical microscopy. Although polymers usually possess quite different properties to metals and ceramics, they are just as susceptible to failure from mechanical overload, fatigue and stress corrosion cracking if products are poorly designed or manufactured. Many plastics are susceptible to attack by active chemicals like chlorine, present at low levels in potable water supplies, especially if the injection mouldings are faulty.

ESEM is especially useful for providing elemental analysis from viewed parts of the sample being investigated. It is effectively a technique of microanalysis and valuable for examination of trace evidence. On the other hand, colour rendition is absent, and there is no information provided about the way in which those elements are bonded to one another. Specimens will be exposed to a vacuum, so any volatiles may be removed, and surfaces may be contaminated by substances used to attach the sample to the mount.

Elastomers

Rubber products are often safety-critical parts of machines, so that failure can often cause accidents or loss of function. Failed products can be examined with many of the generic polymer methods, although it is more difficult if the sample is vulcanized or cross-linked. Attenuated total reflectance infra-red spectroscopy is useful because the product is usually flexible so can be pressed against the selenium crystal used for analysis. Simple swelling tests can also help to identify the specific elastomer used in a product. Often the best technique is ESEM using the X-ray elemental analysis facility on the microscope. Although the method only provides elemental analysis, it can provide clues as to the identity of the elastomer being examined. Thus the presence of substantial amounts of chlorine indicates polychloroprene while the presence of nitrogen indicates nitrile rubber. The method is also useful in confirming ozone cracking by the large amounts of oxygen present on cracked surfaces. Ozone attacks susceptible elastomers such as natural rubber, nitrile rubber and polybutadiene and associated copolymers. Such elastomers possess double bonds in their main chains, the group which is attacked during ozonolysis.

The problem occurs when small concentrations of ozone gas are present near to exposed elastomer surfaces, such as O-rings and diaphragm seals. The product must be in tension, but only very low strains are sufficient to cause degradation.

See also

Applied spectroscopy
Brittleness
Circumstantial evidence
Forensic engineering
Forensic polymer engineering
Forensic science
Fracture
Fractography
Fracture mechanics
Ozone cracking
Polymer degradation
Skid mark
Stress corrosion cracking
Trace evidence

References

Lewis, Peter Rhys, Reynolds, K, Gagg, C, Forensic Materials Engineering: Case studies, CRC Press (2004).
Lewis, Peter Rhys Forensic Polymer Engineering: Why polymer products fail in service, 2nd edition, Woodhead/Elsevier (2016).

Engineering disciplines
Materials science
Materials engineering